Wilhelm Körner, later a.k.a. Guglielmo Körner (April 20, 1839 in Cassel – March 29, 1925 in Milan), was a German chemist.

Life
Körner studied chemistry at Giessen, where he graduated in 1860. In 1866, he became assistant to Kekulé at Ghent. In 1867, when Kekulé was called to Bonn, Körner left Ghent for Palermo where entered the laboratory of Stanislao Cannizzaro, and occupied himself with the study of the aromatic compounds. Besides his work on aromatic compounds, his interest in botany led him to the study of many vegetable substances. In 1870, he accepted the chair of organic chemistry at "Scuola Superiore di Agricoltura" ("School of Agriculture", University of Milan), where he retained until 1922, when for reasons of health he resigned his chair at the age of 83.

Works

References

1839 births
1925 deaths
19th-century German chemists
German emigrants to Italy
20th-century Italian chemists
Academic staff of the University of Palermo
Academic staff of the University of Milan